In astrophysics, the Chandrasekhar virial equations are a hierarchy of moment equations of the Euler equations, developed by the Indian American astrophysicist Subrahmanyan Chandrasekhar, and the physicist Enrico Fermi and Norman R. Lebovitz.

Mathematical description

Consider a fluid mass  of volume  with density  and an isotropic pressure  with vanishing pressure at the bounding surfaces. Here,  refers to a frame of reference attached to the center of mass. Before describing the virial equations, let's define some moments.

The density moments are defined as

 

the pressure moments are

the kinetic energy moments are

and the Chandrasekhar potential energy tensor moments are

where  is the gravitational constant.

All the tensors are symmetric by definition. The moment of inertia , kinetic energy  and the potential energy  are just traces of the following tensors

Chandrasekhar assumed that the fluid mass is subjected to pressure force and its own gravitational force, then the Euler equations is

First order virial equation

Second order virial equation

In steady state, the equation becomes

Third order virial equation

In steady state, the equation becomes

Virial equations in rotating frame of reference

The Euler equations in a rotating frame of reference, rotating with an angular velocity  is given by

Steady state second order virial equation

In steady state, the second order virial equation becomes

 

If the axis of rotation is chosen in  direction, the equation becomes

and Chandrasekhar shows that in this case, the tensors can take only the following form

Steady state third order virial equation

In steady state, the third order virial equation becomes

 

If the axis of rotation is chosen in  direction, the equation becomes

Steady state fourth order virial equation

With  being the axis of rotation, the steady state fourth order virial equation is also derived by Chandrasekhar in 1968. The equation reads as

Virial equations with viscous stresses

Consider the Navier-Stokes equations instead of Euler equations,

and we define the shear-energy tensor as

With the  condition that the normal component of the total stress on the free surface must vanish, i.e., where  is the outward unit normal, the second order virial equation then be

This can be easily extended to rotating frame of references.

See also

 Virial theorem
 Dirichlet's ellipsoidal problem
 Chandrasekhar tensor

References

Stellar dynamics
Fluid dynamics